Srđan Đukanović (born 4 November 1980) is a Montenegrin former professional footballer who played as a midfielder. He is best remembered for his time with Vrbas and Hajduk Kula.

References

External links
 
 
 

1980 births
Living people
People from Vrbas, Serbia
Serbian people of Montenegrin descent
Association football midfielders
Serbia and Montenegro footballers
Serbian footballers
Montenegrin footballers
FK Vrbas players
FK Hajduk Kula players
FK Mladost Apatin players
Odra Opole players
FK Cement Beočin players
FK Donji Srem players
FK TSC Bačka Topola players
Second League of Serbia and Montenegro players
First League of Serbia and Montenegro players
Serbian First League players
Serbian SuperLiga players
I liga players
Montenegrin expatriate footballers
Expatriate footballers in Poland
Montenegrin expatriate sportspeople in Poland